In Order to Survive (Russian: Чтобы выжить, tr. Chtoby Vyzhit or Chtoby Perezhit), also known as Red Mob, is a 1992 Russian action film directed and co-written by Vsevolod Plotkin, and starring Vladimir Menshov, Alexander Rosenbaum, and Sergey Veksler.

Cast
 Vladimir Menshov as Oleg
 Aleksandr Rozenbaum as Jaffar
 Sergey Veksler as Nick
 Mitya Volkov as Yura
 Andrey Scherbovich-Vecher as Igor
 Yakov Golyakov as Old-Aka
 Murad Aliev as Kochmat
 Yuriy Gorobez as Secretary of ZK
 Oxana Salech as Gabrikova
 Anvar Kemdzaev as Abdi
 Arsen Amspuryanz as Old Businessman

Home media
In 2016, the film was restored in 2K and received a limited edition DVD and Blu-ray release under the title Red Mob by Vinegar Syndrome. Vinegar Syndrome later gave the film a standard edition DVD and Blu-ray release. Both releases contain the Russian version of the film, as well as a slightly extended American version.

References

External links
 

1992 action films
1992 films
Russian action films
1990s Russian-language films